Axinopalpis is a genus of longhorn beetles.

Graciliini